Mary MacLeod may refer to:

 Mary MacLeod (actress) (1937–2016), Scottish actress
 Mary Anne MacLeod Trump (1912–2000), mother of Donald Trump
 Mary Macleod (born 1969), British Conservative Party politician, Member of Parliament for Brentford and Isleworth 2010 – 2015
 Mary Isabella Macleod (1852–1933), pioneer and husband of James Macleod

See also
Mary McLeod (disambiguation)